The Women's scratch at the 2011 UCI Track Cycling World Championships was held on March 26. 19 athletes participated in the contest. The competition consisted of 40 laps, making a total of 10 km.

Results
The race was held at 17:20.

References

2011 UCI Track Cycling World Championships
UCI Track Cycling World Championships – Women's scratch
UCI